Santa Ana Unified School District Intermediate Schools is a school district based in Santa Ana, California, United States. It contains the following schools:

 Carr Intermediate School. The school is named after Gerald P. Carr, a former NASA astronaut, from Santa Ana, California.
 Lathrop Intermediate School. The school is named after Julia Lathrop, the first director of the newly created U.S. Children's Bureau from 1912 to 1921.
 MacArthur Fundamental Intermediate. The school is named after Douglas MacArthur, former Chief of Staff of the United States Army.
 McFadden Intermediate School
 Mendez Fundamental Intermediate School. The school is named after Gonzalo Mendez &  Felicitas Mendez, a Latino activist couple.
 Sierra Intermediate School
 Spurgeon Intermediate School
 Villa Fundamental Intermediate School
 Willard Intermediate School. The school is named after Frances E. Willard, an American educator, temperance reformer, and women's suffragist.

References

External links
SAUSD Webpage
SAUSD Intermediate School Webpage

Education in Santa Ana, California